The Hinckley Times is a weekly paid-for tabloid newspaper which is distributed every Wednesday and mainly serves the area of Hinckley. The paper further serves the surrounding areas in Leicestershire, including Market Bosworth, Coalville and Lutterworth.

Founding 
The Hinckley Times was founded in  January 1889 by Thomas Baxter, the son of John Baxter, who was a newspaper printer and publisher in the town.

In 1922, 35 years after the creation of The Times, Baxter merged the paper with a rival town publication owned by local printer Arthur Pickering, named The Hinckley Times & Guardian, Bosworth Herald & South Leicestershire Advertiser. Following the acquisition of the paper, it was renamed to the much simpler title of The Hinckley Times and Guardian, which better reflected the merger. From 1962, the title was swapped back to the original and current title of The Hinckley Times.

In June 1980, The Hinckley Times moved out of the Baxter family's Castle Street newspaper offices, printing, and publishing house to a new premises on Brunel Road.

On 29 February 1996, The Hinckley Times launched 'one of the first ever websites' for a local newspaper.

The newspaper stopped trading as an independent publication when it was acquired in 1997 by Coventry Newspapers Limited. Following several takeovers and mergers, the owners became Trinity Mirror, who operate in the modern day as Reach plc.

The Hinckley Times stayed in Brunel Road until 2012 when the offices were flattened to make way for a newly-built bus station as a part of The Crescent's shopping and leisure complex. This seen the paper move to The Atkins Building on 23 November 2012.

In October 2019, it was announced by the Times' owner, Reach plc, that the Hinckley Times' newspaper offices inside of The Atkins Building would close and move to the Leicester Mercury offices in Leicester city centre by the end of the year. The closure of the offices affected two Hinckley journalists working in town, and three Loughborough Echo journalists in Loughborough who also seen their offices close at the same time.

References 

Hinckley
Newspapers published in Leicestershire
Newspapers established in 1889
1889 establishments in England
Newspapers published by Reach plc